Katherine Sauerbrey (born 5 May 1997) is a German cross-country skier who represented Germany at the 2022 Winter Olympics.

Career
Sauerbrey made her World Cup debut in 2021. She represented Germany at the 2022 Winter Olympics and won a silver medal in the women's 4 × 5 kilometre relay.

Cross-country skiing results
All results are sourced from the International Ski Federation (FIS).

Olympic Games

World Championships

World Cup

Season standings

Personal life
Her brother, Chris Ole Sauerbrey, represented Germany in cross-country skiing at the junior level.

References

External links

1997 births
Living people
German female cross-country skiers
Tour de Ski skiers
People from Steinbach-Hallenberg
Cross-country skiers at the 2022 Winter Olympics
Medalists at the 2022 Winter Olympics
Olympic silver medalists for Germany
Olympic medalists in cross-country skiing
Olympic cross-country skiers of Germany
Sportspeople from Thuringia